Meghan Elisabeth Schnur (born April 16, 1985) is a retired American soccer midfielder, who played for Sky Blue FC of Women's Professional Soccer, and was a member of the United States U-23 women's national soccer team. Schnur is an alumnus of Butler Senior High School.

Career 
Schnur played college soccer at the University of Connecticut from 2003 until 2007, and was a First Team All-Big East selection each year. In 2007, she was named an NSCAA All-American, and was a two-time Big East Midfielder of the Year.

In 2009, Schnur was selected in the second round (11th overall) in the inaugural Women's Professional Soccer draft by Sky Blue FC, later winning the first league title. After knee surgery in 2011, Schnur retired from professional soccer to pursue a career as a physical therapist.

In 2013, Schnur was inducted into the WPIAL Hall of Fame.

References

External links
 
 US Soccer player profile
 Sky Blue FC player profile
 New England Mutiny player profile

1985 births
Living people
UConn Huskies women's soccer players
NJ/NY Gotham FC players
MagicJack (WPS) players
American women's soccer players
Women's association football midfielders
United States women's international soccer players
Women's Professional Soccer players